George Scales (14 March 1923 – June 1993) was an English footballer, who played as a goalkeeper in the Football League for Chester.

After retiring from football, Scales became a publican at the Pen Y Bryn Pub in Llanrwst.

References

Chester City F.C. players
Manchester City F.C. players
Rhyl F.C. players
Association football goalkeepers
English Football League players
1923 births
1993 deaths
Sportspeople from Northwich
English footballers